Patrizia Ciofi (born 7 June 1967) is an Italian operatic coloratura soprano.

Career
Born in Casole d'Elsa, Ciofi studied at the Istituto Musicale Pietro Mascagni in Livorno.  She subsequently took part in master classes at the Accademia Musicale Chigiana, Siena, with Carlo Bergonzi and Shirley Verrett. She made her debut in Gino Negri's Giovanni Sebastiano at the Teatro Comunale, Florence in 1989.
She began her collaboration with the Festival della Valle d'Itria, featuring in La sonnambula (1994), Cherubini's Médée (1995), Piccinni's L'americano (1996), French version of Lucia di Lammermoor (1997), Giordano's Mese mariano and Il re (1998), Traetta's Ippolito ed Aricia (1999), Rossini's Otello and Meyerbeer's Robert le diable (2000).

She made her La Scala debut in 1997 with La traviata, conducted by Riccardo Muti, and returned for L'elisir d'amore in 1998 and 2001. She has sung in most of the major Italian opera houses as well as the Rossini Opera Festival in Pesaro.

She has also sung in Paris, at the Châtelet, the Paris Opera and the Théâtre des Champs-Elysées, in Lyon and Marseille, also sung at the Gran Teatre del Liceu in Barcelona. She made her Covent Garden debut in 2002 with Rigoletto, her Chicago debut in 2003 with La traviata and Wiener Staatsoper debut in 2008 with La sonnambula.

Her major roles on stage include Amina in Vincenzo Bellini's La sonnambula, Violetta in Giuseppe Verdi's La traviata, Gilda in Rigoletto, Susanna in Mozart's Le nozze di Figaro, and Lucia in Gaetano Donizetti's Lucia di Lammermoor (in both the standard Italian version and the French version Lucie de Lammermoor of 1839).

Ciofi has also made a number of recordings, including the Le nozze di Figaro, conducted by René Jacobs, which won the 2005 Grammy Award for Best Opera Recording. Another example is the recording of Giacomo Meyerbeer's Opera Il crociato in Egitto together with the Male Soprano Michael Maniaci at La Fenice in Venice.

In December 2012, she was brought in at very short notice to sing Isabelle in the revival of Giacomo Meyerbeer's  Robert le diable at the Royal Opera House, London, replacing Jennifer Rowley.

Partial discography
 La sonnambula by Vincenzo Bellini (1995) Nuova Era
 Médée by Luigi Cherubini (1996, re-issued 2008) Nuova Era (role of Dircé)
 L'americano by Niccolò Piccinni (1996) Dynamic
 Lucie de Lammermoor by Gaetano Donizetti (1998) Dynamic
 Il Rè & Mese Mariano by Umberto Giordano (1999) Dynamic
 Ippolito ed Aricia by Tommaso Traetta (2000) Dynamic
 Die Entführung aus dem Serail by Wolfgang Amadeus Mozart (2003) TDK DVD
 Benvenuto Cellini by Hector Berlioz (2004) Virgin Classics
 Amor e gelosia (with  Joyce DiDonato) compilation of operatic duets by George Frederic Handel (2004) CD Virgin Classics
 Lucie de Lammermoor by Gaetano Donizetti (2002) TDK DVD
 Le nozze di Figaro by Wolfgang Amadeus Mozart (2004) Harmonia Mundi
 Bajazet by Antonio Vivaldi (2005) Virgin Classics
 Radamisto by Handel (2005) Virgin Classics
 Pia de' Tolomei by Gaetano Donizetti (2005) - Video Live recording on DVD - Dynamic
 Chérubin by Jules Massenet (2006) - Video Live recording on DVD - Dynamic
 Il crociato in Egitto by Giacomo Meyerbeer (2007) - Video Live recording on DVD - Dynamic
 Robert le Diable by Giacomo Meyerbeer (2012) - Live recording - Brilliant Classics
 Dinorah by Giacomo Meyerbeer (2014) – Live recording from a concert performance – cpo
 Motets (with  Fabio Biondi & Europa Galante)  by Antonio Vivaldi (2004) CD Virgin Classics

Repertoire

Giuseppe Verdi
Falstaff (Nannetta)
Rigoletto (Gilda)
La traviata (Violetta)
Giacomo Puccini
Gianni Schicchi (Lauretta)
Vincenzo Bellini
I Capuleti e i Montecchi (Giulietta)
La sonnambula (Amina)
La straniera (Alaide)
Gaetano Donizetti
Don Pasquale (Norina)
L'elisir d'amore (Adina)
La fille du régiment (Marie)
Lucia di Lammermoor (Lucia)
Maria Stuarda (Maria)
Pia de' Tolomei (Pia)
Gioachino Rossini
Adelaide di Borgogna (Adelaide)
Otello (Desdemona)
Tancredi (Amenaide)
Il turco in Italia (Fiorilla)
Il viaggio a Reims (Corinna)
Wolfgang Amadeus Mozart
Così fan tutte (Fiordiligi)
Le nozze di Figaro (Contessa)
Die Entführung aus dem Serail (Blonde)
Mitridate, Re di Ponto (Aspasia)
Georges Bizet
Les pêcheurs de perles (Leila)
Antonio Vivaldi
Bajazet (Idaspe)
Georg Friedrich Händel
Alcina (Alcina)
Giulio Cesare (Cleopatra)
Jules Massenet
Cendrillon (Cendrillon)
Manon (Manon)
Umberto Giordano
Mese mariano (Carmela)
Il re (Rosalina)
Giacomo Meyerbeer
Il crociato in Egitto (Palmide)
Robert le diable (Isabelle)
Tommaso Traetta
Ippolito ed Aricia (Aricia)
Luigi Cherubini
 Médée (Dircé)
Niccolò Piccinni
L'americano (Silvia)

Notes

External links

 Patrizia Ciofi Information: Complete discography, performance history and reviews
 
 Virgin Classics
 Intermezzo Management

1967 births
Living people
People from Casole d'Elsa
Italian operatic sopranos
Grammy Award winners
Accademia Musicale Chigiana alumni
20th-century Italian women opera singers
21st-century Italian women opera singers